In geometry, the rhombitetraapeirogonal tiling is a uniform tiling of the hyperbolic plane. It has Schläfli symbol of rr{∞,4}.

Constructions 
There are two uniform constructions of this tiling, one from [∞,4] or (*∞42) symmetry, and secondly removing the mirror middle, [∞,1+,4], gives a rectangular fundamental domain [∞,∞,∞], (*∞222).

Symmetry 
The dual of this tiling, called a deltoidal tetraapeirogonal tiling represents the fundamental domains of (*∞222) orbifold symmetry. Its fundamental domain is a Lambert quadrilateral, with 3 right angles.

Related polyhedra and tiling

See also

Square tiling
Tilings of regular polygons
List of uniform planar tilings
List of regular polytopes

References
 John H. Conway, Heidi Burgiel, Chaim Goodman-Strass, The Symmetries of Things 2008,  (Chapter 19, The Hyperbolic Archimedean Tessellations)

External links 

 Hyperbolic and Spherical Tiling Gallery
 KaleidoTile 3: Educational software to create spherical, planar and hyperbolic tilings
 Hyperbolic Planar Tessellations, Don Hatch

Hyperbolic tilings
Isogonal tilings
Uniform tilings